The 1931 Fabrique Nationale (FN) Baby Browning is a small blowback-operated semi-automatic pistol designed by Belgium-born Dieudonné Saive chambered in .25 ACP (6.35x15 mm).  The pistol features a six-round magazine capacity and is a striker-fired, single action, blow back mechanism. The manual thumb operated safety locks the slide in the closed position when engaged using side thumb pressure.

History
FN produced under license from the American arms designer John Browning the revolutionary Model 1905 pocket pistol. Despite the name FN used for this pistol, it was later marketed as the FN 1906, the V.P. .25 (V.P. denoting Vest Pocket), and most confusingly, the Baby.

The .25 ACP cartridge became widely available during this time. The term ACP stands for "Automatic Colt Pistol".  This cartridge was among the first automatic pistol cartridges to be utilized worldwide.  It was designed with a semi-rimmed shell casing made of brass.  The rim of the shell casing had a slightly larger circumference than the base of the cartridge and an extractor groove was cut directly above it.  The shell casing was headspaced on this small rim; however, the utilization of the rim in this design complicated the mechanics of the cartridge because, while still in the magazine, the rim of one cartridge would sometimes get hung up on the extractor groove of the following cartridge (also known as "rim lock").

The 1905 Vest Pocket pistol incorporated a grip safety mechanism and also a small safety lever on the left side of the frame, which locked the trigger. In addition, this safety lever locked the slide about a half inch back from the front of the pistol to enable easy disassembly.

Design
Pressured by the proliferation of unlicensed copies, FN began work in earnest on a successor product to the 1905 Vest Pocket pistol. Its basic design was used as a starting point for a new design. FN's Director of Operations, Dieudonné Saive (who would later design the Browning Hi-Power pistol and the FN FAL rifle) developed the new version during 1926–1927.

His design was smaller, lighter, and incorporated several refinements and improvements to the 1905 Vest Pocket pistol. The grip safety was eliminated and the small safety lever on the left side of the frame was extended under the grip plate toward the trigger, so that the thumb of a right-handed shooter could easily engage and disengage it. This feature enabled the user to manipulate the safety without having to release his grip on the pistol. The frame has a full-length dust guard extending to the end of the slide, and an area behind the trigger was relieved to allow the user to maintain a more substantial grip than with the 1905 version. The new design also introduced an auto-safety mechanism similar to the one utilized on the Colt Vest Pocket of similar vintage, which prevented the pistol from being fired if the magazine was removed. A cocking indicator was also incorporated and is attached to the firing pin spring opposite the firing pin. It protrudes through a pin hole in the rear of the frame when the pistol is loaded.

The new version was marketed under the name Baby – and some of the original thermal hardened plastic grip plates were molded with both the initials "FN" at the top of the grip plate in a circle and the word "Baby" at the bottom of the grip plate under a raised crescent. This particular pistol came to be known worldwide as the Baby Browning pistol and is the pistol shown in the top picture, except for the "Browning" marked grip plates which indicate a more recent (circa 1960 and beyond) production run utilizing nylon impregnated black polymer grip plates.

During the Vietnam War it was issued to MACVSOG teams with a wallet-like concealment holster as a last resort gun.

Production history

European production
FN manufactured and marketed the Baby Browning from 1931 until 1979, though exports to the US only took place between 1953–1968. About 550,000 units were produced, including the hand chiseled engraved "Renaissance" and the "Lightweight" version. The Lightweight utilized a 6061 T6 aluminum frame and hexavalent chrome-plated (over electro-less nickel) slide and external detail parts.  With the exception of special order nickel-plated units and the above-mentioned versions, all of the 1931 Baby Brownings were finished in chemical hot blue. The halt to exports to the US in 1968 was mandated by the Gun Control Act of 1968 – which was precipitated by Robert Kennedy's assassination involving an Iver Johnson manufactured revolver.  This piece of legislation was signed into law by then President Lyndon Johnson. It forbade the importation of certain firearms, among them the 1931 Baby Browning – but it didn't forbid the domestic production of these same weapons. FN transferred production of the Baby Browning to Manufacture d'armes de Bayonne (MAB) during 1979. Based in Bayonne, France, MAB produced the pistol from 1979 until 1983 when bankruptcy forced it to discontinue production. Production of the Baby Browning ceased in Europe at that time.

North American production – FN-licensed
During 1982, discussions began between FN and its North American-based representative Jim Stone focusing on securing a North American-based contractor to manufacture the Baby Browning on a turnkey basis. In 1984 a Canadian Swiss screw machine shop, Precision Small Parts, Ltd (PSP) entered into a technology transfer and production agreement with FN to manufacture the pistol. It was based in Aurora, Ontario and maintained a subsidiary in Charlottesville, Virginia.

FN issued an order to PSP for 40,000 of the pistols, all to be exported to Austria for onward distribution under the Browning logo.  PSP's owner Joseph Maygar Sr. had a long working relationship with FN dating back to the days of the Hungarian Resistance Movement of WWII. PSP produced firearms parts as well as sub-machine guns for FN. In 1985 the Canadian federal authorities forced PSP to transfer production of the Baby Browning pistol frame (the essential part according to the legal definition of a firearm) to its Virginia, US facility, though the Canadian side of the company continued to manufacture the slide and detail parts for the pistol (except for the magazine, which was contracted out to Mec-Gar of Italy). When the US subsidiary of PSP applied for a federal export permit with the Department of State to transfer the pistols to FN via its Austrian intermediary, the permit was denied.  At that time, Austria was known to be a trans-shipment point for armaments for the Middle East, and presumably the State Department did not want a large number of Baby Browning pistols ending up in that region.

This action on part of the State Department caused PSP to become insolvent. The insolvency of the company eventually precipitated a sale to a US/Canadian-based investor group in 1991 orchestrated by San Francisco, California based merchant banker Lenn Kristal. During 1995 the technology and inventory of parts of the FN Baby Browning project was spun out by the investor group into a new entity under Kristal's control and direction, which became known as Precision Small Arms, Inc. (PSA), and the pistol was rebranded at that time as the PSA-25 Baby.

, PSA offers 27 versions of the original 1931 Baby Browning, including exhibition grade versions which incorporate orange, green and yellow gold, hand chisel engraving and rare materials. All metal parts of the PSA-25 Baby are machined using 4 and 5 axis computerized numeric controlled machining centers and process dimensional control probe technology. All metal parts are hand finished. In 2008 a 303 stainless steel version of the pistol was introduced, and in 2009 a hand drop forged 7075-T652 aluminum framed version (the "Featherweight"). Limited edition runs are made of damascus steel and titanium. As of November 2017 primary machining, finish work and assembly of all of PSA's versions of the Baby Browning has been undertaken in Minden, Nevada. The US Patent Office issued a Configuration Patent to PSA for the configuration of the Baby Browning in 2015.

PSA and its former parent company PSP have been the only licensed manufacturers of the Fabrique Nationale 6.35 mm pocket pistol since 1984, although a copy has been produced in the US (see below).

North American production – unlicensed

From 1972 until 1984, Bauer Firearms of Fraser, Michigan manufactured and marketed the Bauer Automatic which is a copy of the Baby Browning machined from 416 investment cast stainless steel. From 1984 to 1986 this pistol was marketed as the Fraser-25.

The Bauer Automatic is an approximate copy of the Baby Browning and was designed as such in order to avoid copyright infringement claims from FN, which at that time still had US patent protection on various components of the 1931 Baby Browning. For example, the Bauer Automatic was produced using 416 stainless steel investment castings while the FN Baby Browning slide and frame were originally produced from 8620 carbon steel bar stock. (However, with the purchase of a European-based investment casting operation during the early 1970s, the FN pistol frame and slide were produced from 8620 Carbon steel investment castings). The Bauer Automatic utilized a different auto safety spring and the barrel was removed (and the slide released from the frame) by twisting it clockwise 45 degrees, rather than counterclockwise, as is the case with the FN Baby Browning. The Bauer Automatic has engraving on both sides of the slide, whereas the FN Baby Browning has engraving only on the side opposite the ejection port. This copy of the Baby Browning is not known for its consistent machining tolerances. Many parts interchange with the FN Baby Browning, including grips, magazines, and various internal parts.

See also
 Astra-Unceta y Cia SA
 Galesi-Brescia
 Fabrique Nationale
 Walther Model 9

References

External links
 PSA-25 Operators Manual
 Precision Small Arms, Inc.

.25 ACP semi-automatic pistols
FN Herstal firearms
Semi-automatic pistols of Belgium